Salem-Keizer may refer to:

 Salem Metropolitan Statistical Area, which includes the cities of Salem and Keizer, Oregon, United States
 Salem-Keizer School District
 Salem-Keizer Transit, currently known as Cherriots
 Salem-Keizer Volcanoes, a minor league baseball team